= J.T. Patterson Labs Building =

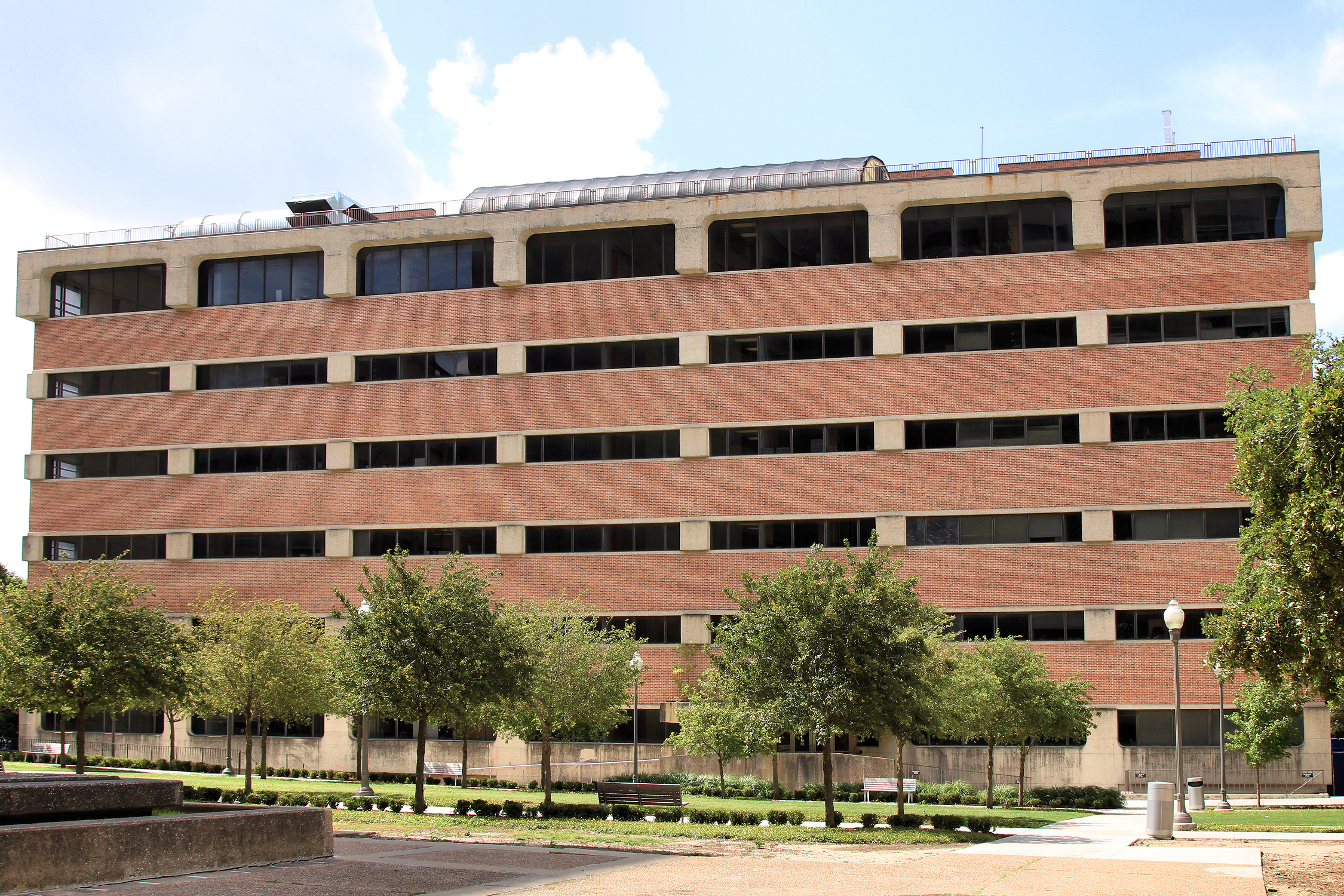
- The J.T. Patterson Labs Building
- Interactive map of the J.T. Patterson Labs Building area

General information
- Location: University of Texas at Austin, 2415 Speedway, Austin, Texas, United States
- Coordinates: 30.288007497889865°N 97.73644916011084°W
- Opened: 1967
- Owner: University of Texas at Austin

Height
- Top floor: 9

Technical details
- Floor count: 9

Design and construction
- Architecture firm: Brooks and Barr

The J.T. Patterson Labs Building (PAT) is a building on the University of Texas at Austin campus, in the U.S. state of Texas. The building was completed in 1967.
